Frank Mautino (born August 7, 1962) is currently Illinois' Auditor General. He was previously a Democratic member of the Illinois House of Representatives, representing the 76th District since 1991. The 76th district anchored in the Ottawa-Streator area and includes the municipalities of Hennepin, Ottawa, Streator, Peru, LaSalle, Oglesby and Spring Valley.

He was appointed Auditor General on October 20 and took the position of Auditor General on January 1, 2016.

Early life and career
Frank Mautino earned an associate degree from Illinois Valley Community College and later earned a bachelor's degree in marketing from Illinois State University. He then served as a Corporate Brand Manager for Mautino Distributing Company.

He is married to his wife Lena with whom he has three children Pietro, Luciana and James. He has also served as the Chairman of the Bureau County Democratic Party.

State Representative
Mautino was appointed to the state house in 1991 and elected in 1992. He served as a full-time legislator and his committee assignments included Rules, Revenue & Finance, Appropriations-General Service, Insurance, Agriculture & Conservation, Property Tax and Public Utilities.

During his time in the House, he was credited with coming up with a solution to fixing the fiscal problems with the state's unemployment insurance trust fund.

In his capacity as a state representative he also sat on the Comprehensive Health Insurance Board of Illinois. He was also a Deputy Majority Leader and chairman of the House Democratic Downstate Caucus.

His associated Senator was Sue Rezin.

Electoral history

References

External links
Biography, bills and committees at the 98th Illinois General Assembly
By session: 98th, 97th, 96th, 95th, 94th, 93rd 
 
Frank J. Mautino at Illinois House Democrats

Members of the Illinois House of Representatives
1962 births
Living people
People from Spring Valley, Illinois
Illinois State University alumni
Illinois Valley Community College alumni
21st-century American politicians